John William Day (15 April 1881 – 9 November 1949) was an English first-class cricketer active 1903–07 who played for Nottinghamshire. He was born in Sutton-on-Trent; died in Saxilby.

References

1881 births
1949 deaths
English cricketers
Nottinghamshire cricketers
People from Sutton-on-Trent
Cricketers from Nottinghamshire
People from West Lindsey District
Lincolnshire cricketers